Pierre Alexandre Schoenewerk (18 February 1820 – 23 July 1885), or Alexandre Schoenewerk, was a French sculptor. He was a student of David d'Angers, and was named a Chevalier of the French Legion of Honor in 1873.

Selected works 
 La jeune Tarantine (Young Tarantine), marble, 1871 (Musée d'Orsay)
 L'Europe (Musée d'Orsay square)
 Jeune fille à la Fontaine, marble, 1873
 The bather, marble
 Andromeda, bronze

References 

 Jane Turner, The Dictionary of Art, Grove, 1996. .
 Hermann Alexander Müller, Allgemeines Künstler-lexicon, Literarische Anstalt, Rütten & Loening, 1901, page 219.
 Artnet entry

1820 births
1885 deaths
Chevaliers of the Légion d'honneur
19th-century French sculptors
French male sculptors
19th-century French male artists